Louis Theroux: Under the Knife is a TV documentary written and presented by Louis Theroux about the people and doctors involved in plastic surgery operations. Filmed mostly in the US, in the programme, Louis himself ends up getting liposuction.

References

External links
 

Louis Theroux's BBC Two specials
BBC television documentaries
2007 television specials
Television shows about plastic surgery
Documentary films about health care
Body image in popular culture
Television episodes set in the United States
BBC travel television series